Gavin Parsonage (born 23 October 1968) is a former Australian racing cyclist. He finished in second place in the Australian National Road Race Championships in 1992 and 1993.

References

External links

1968 births
Living people
Australian male cyclists
Place of birth missing (living people)